Day of the Dead is a holiday celebrated in Mexico and elsewhere on  November 1, and November 2.

Day of the Dead, Día de los Muertos, or Día de Muertos may also refer to:

Film and television 
 Day of the Dead (1985 film), a horror film, the third in George Romero's Dead Series
 Day of the Dead 2: Contagium, a 2005 film that is an unofficial prequel to the 1985 film
 Day of the Dead (2008 film), a 2008 remake of the 1985 film
 Day of the Dead: Bloodline a 2018 remake of the 1985 film
 Day of the Dead (soundtrack), a soundtrack album from the 1985 film
 Day of the Dead (TV series), a 2021 television series based on the 1985 film
 "Day of the Dead" (Babylon 5), an episode of the TV series Babylon 5
 Día de muertos (film), 1988

Music 
 Day of the Dead (2016 album), a Grateful Dead tribute album by Red Hot Organization
 Day of the Dead (Hollywood Undead album), 2015
 "Day of the Dead" (song), the title song
 "Day of the Dead", a song by Sopor Aeternus and The Ensemble of Shadows, from the album La Chambre d'Echo
 Day of the Dead EP, a 2004 EP by Dog Fashion Disco
 Dia de los Muertos (band)
 The Day of the Dead (album), a 1978 album by Graham Collier

Other
 The Day of the Dead, an 1859 painting by William-Adolphe Bouguereau

See also 

 All Souls' Day, a Catholic holiday
 Bon Festival, a Japanese Buddhist custom
 Festival of the Dead, held by many cultures throughout the world
 Ghost Festival, a traditional Buddhist and Taoist festival held in Asian countries
 Qingming Festival, a traditional Chinese festival